The Legislative Assembly of the State of Tocantins (Portuguese: Assembleia Legislativa do Estado do Tocantins) is the legislative body of the government of the state of Tocantins in Brazil.

References

State legislatures of Brazil
Politics of Tocantins
Unicameral legislatures
Tocantins